Kendall Pond is a lake in the U.S. state of New York.

Kendall Pond was named after David Kendall, a pioneer citizen.

References

Lakes of Rensselaer County, New York
Lakes of New York (state)